The 1991 World Netball Championships (also known as the Johnson & Johnson World Netball Championship for sponsorship reasons) was the eighth edition of the INF Netball World Cup, a quadrennial premier event in international netball. It was held in Sydney, Australia from 1 to 13 July 1991 and featured 20 teams. At this edition of the tournament, four teams debuted: Cayman Islands, Namibia, Vanuatu and Western Samoa.

The tournament was held at two venues with the Sydney Entertainment Centre hosting the final. The format of the 1991 edition saw a change with the format introducing a knockout phase with the top two teams qualifying to the semi-finals where the winner was decided. Australia defeated New Zealand 53-52 to claim their sixth title.

First round

Group A

Group B

Placement round

Semi-finals

Placement matches

Finals
At the end of the round robin stage, Australia, England, Jamaica and New Zealand qualified through to the semi-finals which was played at the Sydney Entertainment Centre. The first semi-final saw New Zealand got off to a blistering start against England scoring the first ten goals in the process before Joan Bryan scored the English first goal. That start would later be the key with New Zealand defeating England by twenty goals. In the second semi, an ankle injury to Sue Kenny didn't deter Australia with the hosts defeating Jamaica by six goals with the third quarter being in the match winning quarter.

After Jamaica won the third-place playoff by nine goals over England, the final was between Australia and New Zealand at the Sydney Entertainment Centre which was sold-out. Despite New Zealand leading at each of the quarter breaks, the Australians stayed in the game with the lead see-sawing many times throughout the match. The final seconds of the match saw replacement goal-keeper Roselee Jencke intercept a pass which was heading to the New Zealand goal-circle which sealed the one point victory with Michelle Fielke stating, "probably the best match" that these two teams played.

Semi finals

Third place play-off

Final

Final placings

Medallists

References

Netball 1991
1991
World Netball Championships
World Netball Championships
Sports competitions in Sydney
1990s in Sydney
July 1991 sports events in Australia
Netball in New South Wales